Cosminele is a commune in Prahova County, Muntenia, Romania. It is composed of four villages: Cosmina de Jos (the commune centre), Cosmina de Sus, Drăghicești and Poiana Trestiei.

References

Communes in Prahova County
Localities in Muntenia